Dysoxylum rigidum is a tree in the family Meliaceae. The specific epithet  is from the Latin meaning "rigid", likely referring to the leaflets.

Description
The bark is reddish-grey and when slashed releases an onion-like scent.

Distribution and habitat
Dysoxylum rigidum is found in Sumatra, Peninsular Malaysia and Borneo. Its habitat is lowland rain forest from sea-level to  altitude.

References

rigidum
Trees of Sumatra
Trees of Peninsular Malaysia
Trees of Borneo
Plants described in 1929